RBS TV was the first Latvian commercial television, broadcasting in PAL standard. RBS TV was launched in 1994. "RBS TV" president was Jānis Rušenieks], but the news service was led by Kārlis Streips. RBS TV only worked for about one year. Already in April 1995 RBS TV stopped broadcasting news due to financial problems, but fully broadcasts ceased in October 1995. In 1997, RBS TV went to bankruptcy. On 23 March 2003, RBS TV was eliminated.

References

External links

Television in Latvia
Companies based in Riga
Television channels and stations established in 1994
Television channels and stations disestablished in 1995
1994 establishments in Latvia